The Socialist Party of Latvia (abbr. LSP) is a communist party in Latvia. It is positioned on the far-left on the political spectrum.

It was formed in 1994 as a successor party to the Communist Party of Latvia, which was banned in 1991. According to the "programme of the party", the LSP was founded as an organization upholding socialist ideas after the 1991 events that the party describes as a "counter-revolutionary bourgeois-nationalist coup".

Overview 
The current CEOs of the party are Bokišs Fridijs, Burlaks Ingars and Frolovs Vladimirs. Between 1999 and 2015, the position was held by Alfrēds Rubiks, once mayor of Riga and later, leader of the unionist movement and head of the Latvian Communist Party (CPSU platform). He was imprisoned for six years in 1991, on charges of participating in a coup d'état against the Latvian authorities in August 1991. He is not one of the party's members in the Saeima (Latvian Parliament) since he is not allowed to contest elections. However, his sons Artūrs Rubiks and Raimonds Rubiks are members of the Saeima representing the Socialist Party, elected on a joint list with Harmony.

The LSP is more popular among the Russian-speaking population of Latvia. It places a high priority on issues important to ethnic Russians, such as language and citizenship laws. The party also believes that Latvian citizenship should be granted to all citizens of the former USSR living in Latvia in 1990. This would entail a major change in the current law, which only gives automatic citizenship to descendants of people who were citizens of the Republic of Latvia before it was occupied by the Soviet Union in 1940, and requires the Soviet citizens who moved to Latvia between 1940 and 1990 (mainly Russians), to go through a naturalization process.

In the election held on 5 October 2002, the party was part of the For Human Rights in United Latvia coalition that won 19.0% of the popular vote and 25 out of 100 seats, 5 of those seats went to Socialist Party. The party was a member of this alliance of predominantly Russian-speaking parties from 1998 to 2003.

Today, the party's platform is centered on anti-corruption and promoting an independent Latvia that is free from European Union centralized power. In 2005, the LSP entered the Harmony Centre coalition, which won 17 seats in the 2006 election. Four of these 17 parliament members were representatives of the Socialist Party. In 2011, HC won 31 seats, with the Socialists receiving three seats (Artūrs Rubiks, Raimonds Rubiks and Igors Zujevs). The party did not contest the 2014 parliamentary election, however, all three of its outgoing MPs were placed on the SDPS list and were members of the "12th Saeima" (2014–2018). The same strategy was used in the 2018 election, but only Artūrs Rubiks was elected. The party gained a seat within the Harmony list for the 2020 Riga City Council election, with Artūrs Rubiks' older brother Raimonds Rubiks being elected.

Election results

Legislative elections

European Parliament elections

References

External links
Official website 

Communist parties in Latvia
Political parties established in 1994
1994 establishments in Latvia
Far-left political parties
International Meeting of Communist and Workers Parties